The Peter Rothwell to Nordlicht series of steam engines were early, passenger train, tender locomotivess operated by the Leipzig–Dresden Railway Company (Leipzig-Dresdner Eisenbahn or LDE) in Germany.

History 
The six locomotives were delivered from 1838 to 1840 by Rothwell, England to the LDE. They were given the names PETER ROTHWELL, SALAMANDER, MAGDEBURG, SIMSON, ALTENBURG and NORDLICHT.

The engines were retired between 1856 and 1864.

See also 
 Royal Saxon State Railways
 List of Saxon locomotives and railbuses
 Leipzig–Dresden Railway Company

Sources 

 
 

2-2-2 locomotives
Locomotives of Saxony
Early steam locomotives
Standard gauge locomotives of Germany

Passenger locomotives